Horovlu (also, Goravly, Gorovlu, and Khorovlu) is a village in the Jabrayil Rayon of Azerbaijan. Currently uninhabited.

It was occupied by the Armed Forces of Armenia between 1993 and late 2020.

References 

Populated places in Jabrayil District